Duplin County is a county located in the U.S. state of North Carolina. As of the 2020 census, the population was 48,715. Its county seat is Kenansville.

History
The county was formed in 1750 from New Hanover County.  It was named for Thomas Hay, Viscount Dupplin (later 9th Earl of Kinnoull), as he was known when he served on the Board of Trade and Plantations in England in the 1740s.

In 1784, the western part of Duplin County became Sampson County.

John Miller, a merchant in Duplin, was appointed as postmaster. In the 19th century, he migrated to Leon County in the panhandle of Florida, with other North Carolinians during the period of Indian Removal in the 1830s–1840s. There, he developed a successful cotton plantation. He  called it Miccosukee Plantation, after one of the Seminole bands. (They are now a federally recognized tribe.)

Geography

State and local protected area
 Angola Bay Game Land (part)
 Cabin Lake County Park

Major water bodies
 Doctors Creek
 Goshen Swamp
 Groove Creek
 Island Creek
 Limestone Creek
 Little Limestone Creek
 Maxwell Creek
 Millers Creek
 Northeast Cape Fear River
 Stewards Creek

Adjacent counties
 Wayne County - north
 Lenoir County - northeast
 Jones County - east
 Onslow County - east
 Pender County - south
 Sampson County - west

Major highways

 
  (Concurrency with US 117)

Major infrastructure
 Duplin County Airport - Kenansville
 Eagles Nest Airport (6N9) - Potters Hill
 Henderson Field Airport (ACZ) - Wallace

Demographics

2020 census

As of the 2020 United States census, there were 48,715 people, 21,466 households, and 14,504 families residing in the county.

2000 census
As of the census of 2000, there were 49,063 people, 18,267 households, and 13,060 families residing in the county.  The population density was 60 people per square mile (23/km2).  There were 20,520 housing units at an average density of 25 per square mile (10/km2).  The racial makeup of the county was 58.67% White, 28.94% Black or African American, 0.23% Native American, 0.15% Asian, 0.07% Pacific Islander, 10.87% from other races, and 1.06% from two or more races.  15.14% of the population were Hispanic or Latino of any race.

There were 18,267 households, out of which 33.20% had children under the age of 18 living with them, 52.20% were married couples living together, 14.20% had a female householder with no husband present, and 28.50% were non-families. 24.50% of all households were made up of individuals, and 11.10% had someone living alone who was 65 years of age or older.  The average household size was 2.63 and the average family size was 3.10.

In the county, the population was spread out, with 26.10% under the age of 18, 9.60% from 18 to 24, 29.30% from 25 to 44, 22.10% from 45 to 64, and 12.90% who were 65 years of age or older.  The median age was 35 years. For every 100 females there were 98.30 males.  For every 100 females age 18 and over, there were 95.60 males.

The median income for a household in the county was $29,890, and the median income for a family was $34,760. Males had a median income of $26,212 versus $20,063 for females. The per capita income for the county was $14,499.  About 15.30% of families and 19.40% of the population were below the poverty line, including 22.50% of those under age 18 and 22.70% of those age 65 or over.

Government and politics
Duplin County is a member of the regional Eastern Carolina Council of Governments.

Duplin County is represented by Senator William Brent Jackson, a Republican member of North Carolina's 10th Senate district.

Duplin County is represented by Jimmy Dixon (R) in the North Carolina House of Representatives in the 4th district.

Economy
Duplin County is important in raising animals for food. It has more hogs than any other county in the United States—2.2 million in 1998, which is greater than the hog population of most states. The county is also the home to a major chicken and turkey industry.

Duplin is also home to Duplin Winery, the oldest winery in North Carolina and the largest winery in the Southeast.

Education
Duplin County is home to James Sprunt Community College.

Communities

Towns

 Beulaville
 Calypso
 Faison (part)
 Greenevers
 Harrells (part)
 Kenansville (county seat)
 Magnolia
 Mount Olive (part)
 Rose Hill
 Teachey
 Wallace (largest town, parts within Pender County)
 Warsaw

Townships

 Albertson
 Cypress Creek
 Faison
 Glisson
 Island Creek
 Kenansville
 Limestone
 Magnolia
 Rockfish
 Rose Hill
 Smith
 Sarecta
 Warsaw
 Wolfscrape

Census-designated places
 Bowdens
 Chinquapin
 Potters Hill

Unincorporated communities
 Fountaintown
 Kornegay
 Murphey
 Pasley
 Hallsville

Notable people 
 Peter Weddick Moore (1859–1934), North Carolina educator and the first president of Elizabeth City State University. Moore was born near Faison, NC, to Weddick and Alecy Thompson Moore, who were both enslaved African Americans.
 Ruth Faison Shaw (1889–1969), American artist and educator who is credited with introducing finger painting into the United States education system. Shaw was born in Kenansville, NC.
 Charles S. Murphy (1909 – 1983), American attorney who served as the White House Counsel to U.S. President Harry S. Truman from 1950 to 1953, and during the Kennedy and Johnson administrations as Under Secretary of Agriculture, from 1960 to 1965; and chairman of the Civil Aeronautics Board from 1965 to 1968. Springs was born on a farm in Wallace, NC. 
 Dr. William Dallas Herring (1916–2007), North Carolina educator who was instrumental in the creation of the North Carolina Community College System. Herring was born in Rose Hill, NC.
 Caleb Davis Bradham (1867–1934), American pharmacist, best known as the inventor of the soft drink Pepsi. Bradham was born in Chinquapin, NC.
 Parker D. Robbins (1834–1917), American soldier, legislator, inventor, and postmaster. Robbins was of African and Native American descent and considered a "free black." In 1877, he moved to Duplin County and established a cotton gin, sawmill, and built a steamboat. Robbins was born in Bertie County, NC.
 James Kenan (1740–1810), Colonial and state official; Revolutionary officer; founder of Kenansville, NC; and Sheriff of Duplin County. Kenan was born in Turkey, NC, at his father's plantation, The Lilacs.
 Benjamin Franklin Grady (1831–1914), US Congressman. Author. Teacher. Farmer. Born near Sarecta, Duplin County October 10, 1831. Teaching mathematics and natural sciences at Austin College in Texas when the Civil War began. Superintendent of public instruction for Duplin County from 1881 to 1890. In 1891, he was elected for two terms as a United States Representative for the Third District of North Carolina.

See also
 List of counties in North Carolina
 National Register of Historic Places listings in Duplin County, North Carolina
 List of future Interstate Highways

References

External links

 
 

 
1750 establishments in North Carolina
Populated places established in 1750